Dmytro Borysovych Tymchuk (27 June 1972 – 19 June 2019) was a member of parliament of Ukraine, a Ukrainian military expert and blogger, an officer of the Ukrainian military reserve (Lieutenant Colonel), and one of the coordinators of the Information Resistance blog. During the ongoing 2014 pro-Russian unrest in Ukraine, he became one of the most popular Ukrainian online activists and was extensively cited on the situation in the country.

In 2014 Tymchuk was elected to the Ukrainian parliament for the People's Front.

Early life and education
Tymchuk was born 27 June 1972 in Chita, Russian SFSR, Soviet Union. From 1978 to 1983, he lived in the German Democratic Republic due to his father's service in the Soviet Army and then moved to Berdychiv, Ukrainian SSR, where he spent the rest of his youth. (Both Russia and Ukraine were part of the Soviet Union from 1920 until Ukraine declared its independence from the Soviet Union on 24 August 1991.) In 1995, Tymchuk graduated from the Faculty of Journalism of the Lviv Higher Military-Political School (Soviet predecessor of the Hetman Petro Sahaidachnyi National Ground Forces Academy).

Career
Tymchuk served in the Ukrainian army from 1995 to 1997 and then worked at the headquarters of the National Guard of Ukraine until 2000. From 2000 to 2012, he worked in various divisions of the Ministry of Defense of Ukraine. He served in Iraq, Kosovo, and Lebanon. His highest military rank is lieutenant colonel.

In 2008, Tymchuk became the chief editor of the online publication Fleet-2017 and head of the NGO Center for Military-Political Studies. He is one of the coordinators of the Information Resistance news website. During the 2014 pro-Russian unrest in Ukraine and war in Donbass, Tymchuk became one of the most popular Ukrainian online activists in Ukraine and was extensively cited on the situation in the country. In November 2014, the number of those following his Facebook page exceeded 190,000 IP addresses.

Tymchuk became a founding member of the new party People's Front on 10 September 2014, 46 days before the 2014 Ukrainian parliamentary election. He was elected to the Verkhovna Rada (Ukrainian parliament).

Death
On 19 June 2019, Tymchuk was found dead in his home from a firearm injury to his head. According to media reports and the preliminary working version of the Kyiv police he was cleaning his gun and accidentally discharged it.

References

External links
 Information resistance
 Facebook page
 Tymchuk at Maidan Translations

1972 births
2019 deaths
Pro-Ukrainian people of the 2014 pro-Russian unrest in Ukraine
Ukrainian journalists
Ukrainian military personnel
People from Chita, Zabaykalsky Krai
Internet activists
People's Front (Ukraine) politicians
Eighth convocation members of the Verkhovna Rada
Pro-Ukrainian people of the war in Donbas
Deaths by firearm in Ukraine
Recipients of the Order For Courage, 3rd class